The Port of Janghang is a port in South Korea, located in the county of Seocheon.

References

Janghang